Lisbon is a village in Kendall County, Illinois, United States. The population was 271 at the 2020 census.

The community was established in 1836 with a log tavern and a highway connecting Joliet to Chicago Road. This led to the addition of a post office, an enterprise, and a schoolhouse. The town became part of Kendall County in 1841.

John Moore is credited with naming Lisbon Township, a name with Portuguese origins.

According to Joseph R. Adams in the May 28, 1896, edition of the Kendall County News, "Though ten miles from a railroad, the villagers appear not wanting. They appear to be living better and happier than those differently situated."

Lisbon is now home to Lisbon Consolidated School, the John Moore Park, West Lisbon Church, and Lisbon Bethlehem Lutheran Church.

Geography
Lisbon is located in southern Kendall County at  (41.480600, -88.482740). U.S. Route 52 passes through the north side of the village, leading east to Joliet and west  to Troy Grove.

Demographics

At the 2010 census there were 285 people, 105 households and 78 families residing in the village. There were 111 housing units, of which 6, or 5.4%, were vacant. The racial makeup of the village was 97.2% White, 1.8% some other race, and 1.1% two or more races. Hispanic or Latino of any race were 7.0% of the population.

Of the 105 households in the village, 36.2% had children under the age of 18 living with them, 66.7% were headed by married couples living together, 5.7% had a female householder with no husband present, and 25.7% were non-families. 21.0% of all households were made up of individuals, and 9.6% were someone living alone who was 65 years of age or older. The average household size was 2.71, and the average family size was 3.23.

26.7% of the population were under the age of 18, 7.7% were from 18 to 24, 24.6% were from 25 to 44, 26.0% were from 45 to 64, and 15.1% were 65 years of age or older. The median age was 38.5 years. For every 100 females, there were 109.6 males. For every 100 females age 18 and over, there were 104.9 males.

For the period 2013-17, the estimated annual median household income was $60,313 and the median family income was $62,813. Male full-time workers had a median income of $58,906 and females $33,594. The per capita income for the village was $21,014.

Notable people

 Washington Bushnell, Illinois politician
 John Dwyer, baseball player, catcher and outfielder for the Cleveland Blues

References

Villages in Kendall County, Illinois
Villages in Illinois